José Tarciso de Souza (15 September 1954 – 5 December 2018), known as simply Tarciso, was a Brazilian professional footballer who played as a right winger for clubs in Brazil and Paraguay.

Career
Tarciso led Cerro Porteño to the 1987 Paraguayan Primera División title.

Teams
 América-RJ 1969–1973
 Grêmio 1973–1986
 Criciúma 1986
 Goiás 1986
 Cerro Porteño 1987–1988
 Coritiba 1988–1989
 Goiânia 1992–1994
 São José-PA 1994

References

External links
 Profile at Sambafoot.com Profile at

1951 births
2018 deaths
Brazilian footballers
Association football wingers
Brazil international footballers
Grêmio Foot-Ball Porto Alegrense players
Goiás Esporte Clube players
Goiânia Esporte Clube players
Coritiba Foot Ball Club players
Criciúma Esporte Clube players
Cerro Porteño players
Brazilian expatriate footballers
Brazilian expatriate sportspeople in Paraguay
Expatriate footballers in Paraguay
Deaths from bone cancer